Little Waltham is a village and civil parish just north of Chelmsford, in Essex, England. It is adjacent to the village of Great Waltham. The Domesday Book refers to the two villages as Waltham, consisting of several manors. The site of an Iron Age village was excavated before upgrading the main road north between the current villages.

The village straddles the River Chelmer. Its main street has a number of old houses near the bridge, notably a rare Essex example of a Wealden hall house, now divided into three cottages. A footpath leads south alongside the river to an Area of Outstanding Natural Beauty, part of which is a nature reserve. The countryside is under continued threat from housing and road development.

Amenities
The parish church, St Mary the Virgin, is dedicated to St Martin of Tours, and has a Norman south door with a window above. Its East window features local landmarks shown at the foot of the cross. There is also a United Reformed Church in The Street.

There is a pub in the centre of the village, The White Hart. This has undergone extensive renovation in recent years to turn it from a traditional pub into a more modern "gastro-pub" serving quality food. It has good reviews and an overall 4/5 rating on trip advisor.

The village has a doctor's surgery in Brook Hill, with a pharmacy on site.

There are two main halls in the village, Tufnell Hall and the Memorial Hall. Tufnell Hall is home to the Little Waltham Sports and Social Club, which hosts the village football team as well as badminton. Tufnell Hall has a main hall which is used by the Montessori Nursery School during term times (see Education) and is available for hire for functions, plus a separate bar area open to members and visitors. The Memorial Hall is used by the village playgroup and is also used as the polling station for elections. The United Reformed Church also has a smaller hall which is primarily used for church functions plus the Applepips nursery school.

Sport
The village also has a cricket team; the ground is in the centre of the village opposite the White Hart pub and Tufnell Hall.

A short-lived greyhound racing track was opened in the spring of 1930 on the main Braintree-Chelmsford Road. The racing on Friday evenings was independent (not affiliated to the sports governing body the National Greyhound Racing Club) and was known as a flapping track, which was the nickname given to independent tracks. The grass track held races over 550 yards races and had a covered stand with refreshments available on site. The four-acre site near Ash Tree Corner was put up for sale in February 1931; meetings after this were organised by the Waltham Greyhound and Whippet Club. Equipment from the track at New Writtle Street Stadium was installed here in March 1936.

Education
Most Primary School age children in Little Waltham attend either Little Waltham Church of England Primary School, with some attending Great Waltham Church of England Primary School nearby. High School age children typically attend Chelmer Valley High School in nearby Broomfield. There are also nursery schools in the village, including a Montessori Nursery School; Rainbow Little Waltham, for 2- to 5-year-olds; Applepips at the URC; and the playgroup at the Memorial Hall.

Notes

External links
 Essex Walks - Little and Great Waltham

Villages in Essex
Civil parishes in Essex